Railwayman James William Nightall  (20May 19222June 1944) was posthumously awarded the George Cross and the Order of Industrial Heroism for the gallantry he showed during the Soham rail disaster.  Nightall was an LNER Fireman on a fifty-one wagon ammunition train driven by Benjamin Gimbert. When a wagon caught fire, Nightall helped Gimbert uncouple it from the rest of the train in order to allow Gimbert to tow the burning wagon away from the rest of the ammunition wagons on the train.  The wagon exploded after being towed a distance , killing Nightall instantly, but preventing a chain reaction in the other wagons. The explosion blew a twenty-foot crater in the track, destroyed Soham railway station, and damaged 600 buildings in the village. Gimbert, who miraculously survived the conflagration, was also awarded the George Cross and Order of Industrial Heroism.

Early life
Nightall was born in Littleport Isle of Ely (now Cambridgeshire), England, on 20 May 1922. He was the son of Walter Nightall, a labourer, and Alice Nightall.

He had a fiancee when he died, Edna Belson.

Awards 
The citation for the award of the George Cross read as:

Nightall was also awarded the Order of Industrial Heroism.

Memorials
On 28 September 1981 two Class 47 locomotives were named in honor of the two railwaymen: No. 47577 was named "Benjamin Gimbert, GC" and No. 47579 "James Nightall, GC".
The nameplate "James Nightall G.C" was removed in November 1995. The loco was preserved in March 2007 and is at Mangapps Railway Museum (as at Oct 2015). On 2 June 2004, new "James Nightall G.C" nameplates were applied to 66 079 at Whitemoor yard (March).

References

1922 births
1944 deaths
British train drivers
British recipients of the George Cross
Railway accident deaths in England
People from Littleport, Cambridgeshire
Recipients of the Order of Industrial Heroism
London and North Eastern Railway people